The 1994–95 Bundesliga was the 32nd season of the Bundesliga, Germany's premier football league. It began on 19 August 1994 and ended on 17 June 1995. FC Bayern Munich were the defending champions.

Competition modus
Every team played two games against each other team, one at home and one away. Teams received two points for a win and one point for a draw. If two or more teams were tied on points, places were determined by goal difference and, if still tied, by goals scored. The team with the most points were crowned champions while the three teams with the fewest points were relegated to 2. Bundesliga.

Team changes to 1993–94
1. FC Nürnberg, SG Wattenscheid 09 and VfB Leipzig were relegated to the 2. Bundesliga after finishing in the last three places. They were replaced by VfL Bochum, Bayer 05 Uerdingen and TSV 1860 Munich.

Team overview

 1860 Munich played four high risk home matches at Olympiastadion.

League table

Results

Top goalscorers
20 goals
  Mario Basler (Werder Bremen)
  Heiko Herrlich (Borussia Mönchengladbach)

17 goals
  Toni Polster (1. FC Köln)

16 goals
  Rodolfo Esteban Cardoso (SC Freiburg)
  Pavel Kuka (1. FC Kaiserslautern)
  Rudi Völler (Bayer Leverkusen)

15 goals
  Ulf Kirsten (Bayer Leverkusen)
  Michael Zorc (Borussia Dortmund)

14 goals
  Marco Bode (Werder Bremen)
  Stefan Kuntz (1. FC Kaiserslautern)
  Bruno Labbadia (1. FC Köln)
  Andreas Möller (Borussia Dortmund)

Champion squad

See also
 1994–95 2. Bundesliga
 1994–95 DFB-Pokal

References

External links
 DFB Bundesliga archive 1994/1995

Bundesliga seasons
1
Germany